The EFDA Nations Cup was a Formula Opel competition which was held between 1990 and 1998. The competition pitted international drivers against each other in similar cars, with drivers representing their nations. It was founded by Dan Partel within the Formula Opel/Vauxhall racing series.

The first Nations Cup race was held at the historic Spa-Francorchamps circuit in Belgium on 19–20 July 1990, and organised by the European Formula Drivers Association (EFDA).

History
In 1990, drivers representing 25 countries were already participating in the various Formula Vauxhall/Opel Lotus Series. The Nations Cup format called for two-car national teams. The Formula Vauxhall/Opel Lotus racing series was the only series that could muster twenty legitimate two-car national teams from its active list of competitors.

The format of the event remained the same for the next eight years, with two drivers from each country racing in virtually identical Formula Opel/Vauxhall racing cars painted in their national colours.

The EFDA selected the Spa-Francorchamps circuit, licensed to start 46 cars or 23 two-car teams, for the inaugural event. The winners received the Nations Cup, and the top three teams were awarded gold, silver and bronze medals respectively. The event preceded the Spa 24 Hours race, and occurred in the middle of the racing season.

Champions

References

1992 Nations Cup - YouTube (in Portuguese)
1995 Nations Cup Pt 1 - YouTube
1995 Nations Cup Pt 3 - YouTube
1996 Nations Cup Pt 1 - YouTube
1996 Nations Cup Pt 2 - YouTube 
Team Australia documentary - YouTube

External links
 Fastlines International

 
One-make series
Defunct auto racing series
Formula racing series
Formula racing
Recurring sporting events established in 1990
Recurring sporting events disestablished in 1998